The following are the national records in Olympic weightlifting in Italy. Records are maintained in each weight class for the snatch lift, clean and jerk lift, and the total for both lifts by the Italian Weightlifting Federation (Federazione Italiana Pesistica).

Current records

Men

Women

Historical records

Men (1998–2018)

Women (1998–2018)

References
General
Italian records 
Specific

External links
Italian Weightlifting Federation website

Italy
records
Olympic weightlifting
weightlifting